Iron tetraboride (FeB4) is a superhard superconductor (Tc < 3K) consisting of iron and boron.  Iron tetraboride does not occur in nature and can be created synthetically. Its molecular structure was predicted using computer models.

See also
 Binghamton University
 European Synchrotron Radiation Facility

References

External links
First fully computer-designed superconductor
First computer-designed superconductor created
Scientists create first computer-designed superconductor
X-rays reveal the first designer superconductor
Viewpoint: Materials Prediction Scores a Hit

Borides
Iron compounds
Superconductors
Superhard materials